Carlos Tejedor is a town in the north west of Buenos Aires Province, Argentina. It is the administrative centre of the Carlos Tejedor Partido. It is named after the former Governor of Buenos Aires, Dr. Carlos Tejedor.

External links

Populated places in Buenos Aires Province
Populated places established in 1905
1905 establishments in Argentina